Monson is a surname. Notable people with the surname include:

Ander Monson, American novelist, poet, and nonfiction writer
Dan Monson (born 1961), American college basketball head coach; son of Don Monson
David Smith Monson (born 1945), U.S. Representative from Utah 1985–1987
Don Monson (born 1933), American college basketball head coach
Dori Monson (1961-2022), American radio personality
Sir Edmund Monson, 1st Baronet (1834–1909), British diplomat, minister and ambassador
Sir Edmund Monson, 3rd Baronet (1883–1969), British diplomat
George Monson (1755–1823), English amateur cricketer
Sir Henry Monson, 3rd Baronet (1653–1718), English politician
Henry Monson (gaoler) (1793–1866), New Zealand settler
Ingrid Monson, American academic
Jeff Monson (born 1971), American mixed martial arts fighter
Sir John Monson, 2nd Baronet (1599–1683), English landowner and politician
John Monson (c. 1628 – 1674), English politician
John Monson, 11th Baron Monson (1932–2011), British hereditary peer, crossbench member of the House of Lords, civil liberties campaigner
Marianne Monson (born 1975), American children's author
Martin O. Monson (1885-1969), American politician
Robert Monson (by 1532–1583), English politician and judge
Shaun Monson, American animal, human and environmental rights activist and film director
Sir Thomas Monson, 1st Baronet (1565–1641), English politician
Thomas S. Monson (1927–2018), 16th President of The Church of Jesus Christ of Latter-day Saints (LDS Church)
Walter Monson (1909–1988), Canadian ice hockey player
William Monson (disambiguation), several people

See also
Monsen, an alternate spelling
Momsen, another surname